Iryna Limanouskaya (born 18 May 1994) is a Belarusian synchronized swimmer. She competed in the women's duet at the 2016 Summer Olympics.

In 2018, Limanouskaya and Veronika Yesipovich finished in 9th place in the duet technical routine at the 2018 European Aquatics Championships. In the duet free routine they also finished in 9th place.

References

1994 births
Living people
Belarusian synchronized swimmers
Olympic synchronized swimmers of Belarus
Synchronized swimmers at the 2016 Summer Olympics
Place of birth missing (living people)
Synchronized swimmers at the 2017 World Aquatics Championships